Justice League: Gods and Monsters is a 2015 American animated superhero film and the 23rd film of the DC Universe Animated Original Movies. It features an alternate universe version of the DC Comics superhero team the Justice League. It was released as a download on July 21, 2015, and released on DVD and Blu-ray on July 28.

Plot 
In an alternate universe, the Justice LeagueBatman (Dr. Kirk Langstrom), Wonder Woman (Bekka), and Superman (Hernan Guerra, son of General Zod) is an autonomous brutal force that maintains order on Earth; thus public opinion is mixed with awe and hatred. Scientists Victor Fries, Ray Palmer, and Silas Stone (who was hired by Superman to work on a project for him), along with his young son Victor, are killed by methods similar to the Justice League. President Amanda Waller asks they cooperate with the government's investigation. Meanwhile, Superman invites Lois Lane to the Tower of the Justice, where he tells her of his goals to help humanity and reveals how little he knows about Krypton or his heritage.

Batman discovers an email sent to Dr. Stone and several scientists, including Dr. Will Magnus, Kirk's best friend who helped with his transformation. He asks Magnus, and his wife Tina, about "Project Fair Play", which involved scientists under Lex Luthor's employ; Magnus offers to ask what the others know. Magnus gathers the remaining scientists (John Henry Irons, Thomas Morrow, Michael Holt, Pat Dugan, Emil Hamilton, Karen Beecher (whom Will Magnus argued with), Thaddeus Sivana, Kimiyo Hoshi, and Stephen Shin) for answers. However, they are attacked by three robotic assassins who travel via Boom tube. Despite their efforts, the assassins leave Magnus as the sole survivor of the attack.

The League takes Magnus to the Tower to recover, while Superman flies to Luthor's satellite orbiting the moon. Luthor reveals the Project is a way to destroy the League if necessary; he also reveals the truth about Zod to Superman. As Superman leaves, a robotic assassin who has Superman's powers booms in and destroys the satellite, seemingly killing Luthor. Steve Trevor shows satellite footage of the explosion and Superman's presence to Waller. She retaliates with Project Fair Play, which consists of troops and vehicles armed with energy weapons powered by red solar radiation like Krypton's sun.

Superman and Wonder Woman face the army while Batman stays inside the Tower, where he activates the forcefield, thinking Magnus can clear the League. Tina suddenly appears and subdues Batman before shape-shifting into a liquid metal robot named Platinum, and revives Magnus with an organic nanite serum that enhances his strength and healing. Magnus reveals he orchestrated everything using his Metal Men; he intends to detonate a Nanite Bomb, to forcefully link humanity together into a hive mind. He confesses he killed the real Tina in a fit of rage and replaced her with Platinum, a robotic duplicate. He joined Fair Play for its resources to fund his secret Nanite Bomb project.

As Magnus prepares his weapon, Luthor, who escaped the explosion, teleports into the middle of the battle outside and tells everyone he has discovered Magnus' plan. Batman frees himself and seizes the opportunity to drop the forcefield. With Batman fighting Magnus, Wonder Woman faces Platinum, and Superman takes on the Metal Men, who quickly merge into a single, more powerful entity that initially has the upper hand on Superman due to repeatedly ambushing him via rapid teleportation using its three Mother Boxes within itself. Wonder Woman uses her sword's boom tube to send Platinum into the sun. Simultaneously, Superman finally manages to destroy the Mother Boxes inside the unified Metal Man before taking it underground and melting it inside molten rock. The League destroys the bomb (at the cost of Superman's Kryptonian escape craft) and, after being defeated by Batman, a remorseful Magnus commits suicide by disintegrating himself with nanites as he tells Kirk to forgive him for his actions.

A week later, the Justice League has been cleared of all wrongdoing, and the world, along with Lois Lane, views them differently. Bekka decides to leave the Justice League to face her past along with Luthor, who wants to explore other universes after growing bored with this one. Before leaving, Luthor gives Superman all the data on Krypton and tells him to be a "real hero." The film ends with Superman and Batman deciding to use the data to help humanity.

Cast 

 Michael C. Hall as Kirk Langstrom / Batman
 Benjamin Bratt as Hernan Guerra / Superman
 Tamara Taylor as Bekka / Wonder Woman
 Paget Brewster as Lois Lane
 C. Thomas Howell as Dr. Will Magnus
 Jason Isaacs as Lex Luthor
 Dee Bradley Baker as Ray Palmer, Tin
 Eric Bauza as Ryan Choi, Stephen Shin
 Larry Cedar as Pete Ross
 Richard Chamberlain as Izaya / Highfather
 Trevor Devall as Emil Hamilton, Lightray
 Dan Gilvezan as Pat Dugan
 Grey Griffin as Tina / Platinum
 Daniel Hagen as Doctor Sivana
 Penny Johnson Jerald as President Amanda Waller
 Josh Keaton as Orion
 Arif S. Kinchen as Michael Holt, Cheetah
 Yuri Lowenthal as Jor-El, Jimmy Olsen
 Carl Lumbly as Silas Stone
 Jim Meskimen as Victor Fries
 Taylor Parks as Victor Stone
 Khary Payton as John Henry Irons, Granny Goodness, Punk Mugger
 Tahmoh Penikett as Steve Trevor
 Andrea Romano as Jean Palmer
 André Sogliuzzo as Cop, Mr. Guerra
 Bruce Thomas as General Zod, Uxas / Darkseid
 Lauren Tom as Lara Lor-Van, Kimiyo Hoshi
 Marcelo Tubert as Blockbuster, Tough Guy
 Kari Wahlgren as Karen Beecher, Livewire

Crew 
 Andrea Romano – Casting and Voice Director

Reception 
The film earned $2,928,833 from domestic home video sales.

It received mostly positive reviews from critics. Kofi Outlaw from Screen Rant gave the film 5 out of 5 stars, praising Timm's and Burnett's writing, the new versions of the DC Trinity, the fight scenes and characters and calling it "a must-see for any DC fan". Joshua Yehl of IGN gave the film an 8.9/10 praising the concept, Wonder Woman's origin story, the voice acting and the use of violence.

Tie-in media

Companion series 

In the weeks before the debut of the film, a three-part series, Justice League: Gods and Monsters Chronicles, which focused on the characters and the universe of the film, was released online by Machinima on June 8, 2015. The series is the first collaboration between Warner Bros. and Machinima, following the former's investment of $18 million in Machinima in March 2014. The series is also the first production of Blue Ribbon Content, a digital content production unit of Warner Bros. formed in 2014 and led by the president of Warner Bros. Animation Sam Register.

The first season consisted of three episodes concluding on June 12, 2015. A second season of the series was planned to be released in 2016 and would have featured ten episodes. However, as of September 30, 2020, it has been shelved.

Comic book series 
A series of one-shot comics written by J. M. DeMatteis and Bruce Timm was released and focused on each hero's origin story. Additionally, a three-issue prequel comic book series written by DeMatteis and Timm was also released.

References

External links

DC page: movie, comic

Justice League: Gods and Monsters at The World's Finest

2010s American animated films
2010s direct-to-video animated superhero films
2010s animated superhero films
2015 animated films
2015 direct-to-video films
Animated Justice League films
DC Universe Animated Original Movies
Films produced by Sam Register
Films directed by Sam Liu
Films scored by Frederik Wiedmann
Films with screenplays by Alan Burnett
2010s English-language films